Abacetus tridens is a species of ground beetle in the subfamily Pterostichinae. It was described by Tschitscherine in 1899.

References

tridens
Beetles described in 1899